Beate Scheffknecht (born 27 February 1990) is an Austrian handballer who plays for Thüringer HC and the Austria national team.

Achievements
Bundesliga:
Winner: 2016
DHB-Supercup:
Winner: 2016

References
 

 

  
1990 births
Living people
Sportspeople from Innsbruck
Austrian female handball players
Expatriate handball players
Austrian expatriate sportspeople in Germany